Widford railway station served the village of Widford, Hertfordshire, England, from 1863 to 1964 on the Buntingford branch line.

History 
The station was opened on 3 July 1863 by the Great Eastern Railway. It was situated on the north side of Ware Road. It had a brick-built waiting room and a booking office. At the east end of the platform was a signal box which controlled a siding leading to a cattle and goods dock. Goods traffic ceased on 7 September 1964. The station closed on 16 November 1964.

References 

Disused railway stations in Hertfordshire
Former Great Eastern Railway stations
Railway stations in Great Britain opened in 1863
Railway stations in Great Britain closed in 1964
1863 establishments in England
1964 disestablishments in England
Beeching closures in England
Widford, Hertfordshire